Adelaide's Koala Farm was a private zoo in the city's Park Lands, founded and operated 1936–1960 by (Alfred) Keith Minchin (24 May 1899 – 1 August 1963), a member of the Adelaide Zoo Minchin dynasty.
Originally two operations, the Snake Farm in Adelaide and the Koala Bear Farm 50 miles from Adelaide, they merged in 1934.

History

Minchin was born in Adelaide, son of the director of the Adelaide Zoo, and was educated at St Peter's College. 
In 1921 he was made responsible for exporting Australian animals to zoos overseas, then in 1924–1925 went overseas collecting animals for the Zoo. 
He started a private herpetological collection, with which in March 1927 he founded Adelaide's Snake Park on a  section of the Park Lands. 
The section, which he rented from the Adelaide City Council, lay near Pennington Garden, between the University Oval and King William Road (now part of Park 12/Karrawirra).
Part of its mission was the collection of snake venom for antivenom serum manufacture, but from 1936, when the Snake Park had been incorporated into the Koala Farm, only non-venomous snakes were held.

In 1931 he contracted polio, which left him crippled and dependent on crutches, later a wheelchair.

He had a property  somewhere north of Adelaide, where he bred and studied koalas, which he progressively introduced to the Snake Park, which in March 1934 become a section of the "Koala Bear Farm". In 1936 he applied to the Council for an increase in area for the "Farm" to around one acre.

The source of his first koalas has not yet been found. The species was not uncommon in South Australia before the arrival of foxes and "sportsmen" with rifles, but 100 years later was believed locally extinct apart from three discrete locations not divulged to the public.
Minchin may have received some of those brought into South Australia from Queensland in 1937.

The "Farm" was popular with children, as apart from koalas and snakes, it boasted "Sally" the Timor pony, "Porker" the buckjumping pig, and a performing seal in its own pool with a  diving tower.
Minchin was a good publicist, and attracted celebrity visitors including Noël Coward and the Duke and Duchess of Kent. Among other attractions was a blubber melting pot, a relic of whaling days, which Minchin recovered from Kangaroo Island, and a renovated coach, originally owned by Governor Hindmarsh, drawn by Timor ponies.

Despite hard economic times in the 1930s Minchin was able to make substantial donations to the Adelaide Zoo, of which his brother Ronald was director. The "monkey paddock", open to the sky and holding some 50 rhesus monkeys, was his gift, and its popularity helped reverse the Zoo's fortunes. Minchin's other enterprises include an Aquarium (1933–1946) on the Glenelg jetty.

Minchin never married; he died on 1 August 1963 and was buried at the North Road Cemetery near the grave of his father.

Legacy
As a result of his breeding program, Minchin was able to release many koala families into the wild, notably along the Willson River, near Penneshaw, Kangaroo Island. They prospered, and were a considerable tourist attraction to the island until the late 1990s when, due to overpopulation, both koalas and the manna gums, on which they relied for food, were visibly dying.
Scientists recommended a significant culling, but rather than risk a hostile public reaction, the South Australian Government embarked on a program of surgical sterilization of adult females by veterinarians.

Notes

References

See also
Koala Park Sanctuary, Sydney
Lone Pine Koala Sanctuary, Brisbane

History of Adelaide
Adelaide Zoo
1936 establishments in Australia
1960 disestablishments in Australia